Pseudolithos horwoodii is a species of succulent plant in the genus Pseudolithos. Its growth habit is squat, unbranched, and blob-like, living up to the name of its genus which means "false stone". Its color is green to grayish brown.

References

horwoodii
Flora of Somalia
Plants described in 1974